Sphinx Peak is a massive summit  south of Pyramid Peak, in the southeast part of Destination Nunataks, Victoria Land. It was named in association with Pyramid Peak by the Northern Party of the New Zealand Federated Mountain Clubs Antarctic Expedition (NZFMCAE), 1962–63.

References

Mountains of Victoria Land
Pennell Coast